Nard & B are an American record production team, composed of record producers James "Nard" Bernard Rosser Jr. and Brandon "B" Rackley, from Atlanta, Georgia. In 2007, the duo signed a deal with American recording artist T.I.'s Grand Hustle Records. In 2007, Nard & B founded TrenchWerk Entertainment, a music production company, with the intention of "uniting the best music producers in Atlanta and creating the most undeniable and unmatched production available."

History
Brandon Rackley, professionally known as B, met James Bernard Rosser Jr., professionally known as Nard, while they were both attending at Omnithech, majoring in Music and Engineering. Upon completing college, Nard landed a job as a tracking engineer for Atlanta-based rapper T.I.'s label, Grand Hustle Records. In 2007, Nard & B received their first placement on a major label studio album. The song, titled "That's Right", features vocals from T.I. and was included on Grand Hustle artist Big Kuntry King's debut effort, My Turn to Eat. The success of the record earned them the attention of Grand Hustle president Jason Geter, who signed them as in-house producers. Also in 2007, Nard & B officially remixed T.I.'s hit single "Big Shit Poppin' (Do It)", providing new production while Grand Hustle rappers Mac Boney, Alfamega, JR Get Money and Big Kuntry King, all added new verses. In 2009, Nard & B co-produced Brooklyn-based rapper Maino's hit single "All the Above", alongside high-profile record producer Just Blaze. Nard & B also went on to contribute production on Puff Daddy's 2015 project MMM (Money Making Mitch). In August 2015, Nard & B released a collaborative mixtape, titled Trench Muzik, alongside then-Grand Hustle artist Spodee. On September 13, 2015, Spodee teamed up with Nard & B to release Trench Muzik 2. On November 22, 2015, the third installment of Trench Muzik was released.

On February 9, 2016, Atlanta rapper Skooly, formerly of Rich Kidz, teamed up with Nard & B to release Trench Gotti. On April 21, 2016, Nard & B teamed up with Jose Guapo to release Extravagant Trench Shit. On July 19, 2016, B released a song titled "Out Perform You", under the pseudonym ¡B!. The song, produced by Nard & B and XL Eagle, is the first to drop from B's debut project, "that will feature exclusive records from a variety of artists". The project, which is tentatively scheduled to drop at the end of the year, will include production from Nard & B with co-production from TrenchWerk producer, XL Eagle. On October 11, 2016, Nard & B released a collaborative mixtape with Jamaican rapper and Hustle Gang affiliate Zuse. The mixtape, titled Trench Zuse, enlist some of Nard & B fellow producers such as DJ Spinz, Bobby Kritical, Will A Fool, and DJ Plugg. Southern hip hop producer XL Eagle, a member of the TrenchWerk team, produces on almost every track. In 2017, Migos released "T-Shirt", produced by Nard & B, from their second album Culture. "T-Shirt" managed to reach the Top 40 of the US Billboard Hot 100 chart.

Singles produced

Albums produced

2008
Big Kuntry King - My Turn to Eat
01. "Intro" 
06. "Soul of a Man" 
12. "That's Right" 

T.I. - Paper Trail
04. "On Top of the World" 

DJ MLK & DJ Scream - Respect the Hustle, Vol. 2
08. "4 or 5 Wayz" 
23. "Major League"

2009
Willy Northpole - Tha Connect
06. "Hood Dreamer" 

Birdman - Pricele$$
19. "Sky High" 

Jae Millz - Untitled
00. "Hallelujah" 

Mack Maine - Untitled
00. "Where Dey Do Dat At" 
Maino - If Tomorrow Comes...
07. "All the Above"

2010
T.I. - No Mercy
19. "That's What I Thought" 
Slim Thug - Tha Thug Show
9. "So High" 
Mack Maine - Untitled
00. "All In One Swipe"

2011
Future - Dirty Sprite
14. "Splashin'"

2012
D.O.P.E. - D.O.P.E.
03. "Zombie"
05. "Spazz" 
07. "Deserve It All" 
08. "Like This"
10. "Know Dat" 

Future - Pluto
03. "Straight Up"

DJ Khaled - "Kiss the Ring"
10. I'm Paid 

Future - Pluto 3D
02. "You Deserve It"

2013
Hustle Gang - G.D.O.D. (Get Dough or Die)
16. "Away"

Kevin Gates - The Luca Brasi Story
17. "Hero"

Young Scooter - Street Lottery
05. "Street Lottery" 

Young Thug - 1017 Thug
01. "Yeah Yeah" 
07. "Murder"
10. "Condo Music" 

Gucci Mane - The State vs. Radric Davis II: The Caged Bird Sings
12. "Fugitive"

2014
K Camp - In Due Time
03. Make A Wish"

Future - Honest
02. "T-Shirt"

Future - Monster
06. "Throw Away"
09. "2Pac"

Rich The Kid - Feels Good To Be Rich
03. "Came From Nothin"
18. "Feels Good 2 Be Rich"

Project Pat - Cheez n Dope 3
05. - "Rubber Bands" 
10. - "A1 s" 
13. - "Kitchen Feat Shy Glizzy Cash Out"

2015
Ty Dolla Sign - Free TC
03. "Straight Up" 

Puff Daddy - MMM (Money Making Mitch)
01. "Facts"
09. "Happily Ever After (Interlude)"
14. "Uptown (Shout-Out-Skit)" 

Project Pat - Street God
16. "A1s" 

2 Chainz - Trapavelli Tre
04. "Everything I Know"
16. "Blue Dolphin"

2016
Sosamann - Sauce Eskobar
14. "Right Back" 

Jose Guapo - Extravagant Trench Shit
01. "From My Heart" 
02. "Off Top"
03. "#TeamLitty"  
04. "No Favors" 
05. "Ape Shxt" 
06. "You Won't" 
07. "Shake That Ass" 
08. "Unheard Of"
09. "Make It Right"  
10. "Compete 
11. "Where Is The Luv"
12. "Love & Drugs" 

Street Money Boochie & Tracy T - Diamonds, Money & Dope
07. "Know the Feeling" 

Future - Purple Reign
05. "Inside the Mattress" 

Project Pat - Street God 2
03. "I'm Dat Nigga"
10. "I'm Good"

Trouble - Skoobzilla
01. "TIP Jeezy Boosie"
05. "Traffic" 
11. "Anyway/Everyday" 

Young Dolph - King of Memphis
09. "On My Way" 

Lil Uzi Vert - The Perfect Luv Tape
10. "Seven Million"  

Yung Booke - 6 the Giant
15. "Elevating"

K Camp - RARE
01. "No Question" (produced with Bobby Kritical, XL Eagle and Musik MajorX)
02. "Drag" (produced with Bobby Kritical, XL Eagle and Musik MajorX)
03. "Drop" (produced with Bobby Kritical, XL Eagle and Musik MajorX)
04. "Out the Loop" 
05. "F.A.C.T.S" (produced with Bobby Kritical, XL Eagle and Musik MajorX)
10. "It Ain't Fair" (produced with Bobby Kritical, XL Eagle and Musik MajorX)

2017
Migos - Culture
02. "T-Shirt" 

B Money - F.lip A.ll M.oney
01. "Cups of the XO"

2018
Jordan Kristine Seamon - Untitled EP
02. "Glo Up"

2019
DC Young Fly - Trapsoul
Executive Album Producers

Upcoming
24hrs - Open Late
00. "VSVSVSV"

T-Wayne - TBA
00. "Rain Drop" (featuring Offset)

References

External links
 
 
 
 
 

Record production duos
American songwriting teams
Hip hop duos
American musical duos
Southern hip hop groups
Musical groups from Georgia (U.S. state)
African-American musical groups
African-American record producers
Songwriters from Georgia (U.S. state)
American hip hop record producers
Grand Hustle Records artists